"Old Man" is an American television play broadcast on November 20, 1958, as part of the CBS television series, Playhouse 90.  The production, starring Sterling Hayden and Geraldine Page, was adapted by Horton Foote from the short novel "Old Man" by William Faulkner. It was nominated for three Emmy Awards: for most outstanding program of the year; for best single performance by an actress (Page); and for best writing of a single dramatic program one hour or longer (Foote).

Plot
A prison farm in Mississippi releases prisoners to help fight a flood. The story focuses on the interaction between a tall convict (played by Sterling Hayden), a pregnant young woman (played by Geraldine Page), and the floodwaters. The "Old Man" referenced in the title is the Mississippi River.

Cast
The following performers received screen credit for their performances:

 Sterling Hayden as tall convict
 Geraldine Page as young woman
 Milton Selzer as long-term prisoner
 Malcolm Atterbury as sympathetic physician
 James Westerfield as warden

Melvyn Douglas hosted the broadcast.

Production
John Frankenheimer was the director and Fred Coe the producer. Horton Foote wrote the teleplay based on William Faulkner's short novel "Old Man" published in 1938 as part of the book The Wild Palms.

Reception
In The New York Times, John P. Shanley called it a "superlative production" and praised Geraldine Page for "a performance of remarkable range and sensitivity."

Television critic William Ewald called it "superb" and credited the success to the John Frankenheimer, "one of TV's young geniuses," and Horton Foote. He also praised Page's performance as "brilliant" and called a scene in which Hayden rescued Page from the river in time for her to give birth to a baby as "one of the most moving scenes I've ever witness[ed] on TV."

References

1958 American television episodes
Playhouse 90 (season 3) episodes
1958 television plays